War Games: At the End of the Day is a 2011 independent thriller film directed by Cosimo Alemà, who co-wrote it with Daniele Persica and Romana Meggiolaro. Luca Legnani is credited as executive producer. The film is distributed by Universal Pictures. It stars Stephanie Chapman Baker, Neil Linpow, Michael Lutz, Sam Cohan, Valene Kane, Andrew Harwood Mills, Tom Stanley, Monika Mirga, Daniel Vivian and Michael Schermi.

The film is claimed to be inspired by real events that took place on June 5, 1992.

Plot 

The film follows an adventure seeking group of friends who visit a National Park to spend the day playing Airsoft. However, after discovering a building filled with dark secrets they are hunted down one by one, by the building's vicious occupants: three ex soldiers intent on keeping them from telling anyone. Their war game is turned into a reality, where they will be forced to fight for their survival.

Cast

Production 

War Games: At the End of the Day began filming in August, 2009, and in Bracciano, Italy.

Reception 
The film attracted strong reviews during its theatrical release and has screened at festivals including Cannes Film Festival, Berlin film festival, Fantafest. Courmayeur Noir in festival, Fantasy FilmFest, Sitges Film Festival and Raindance.

References 

 (1) ^http://horrorcultfilms.co.uk/2011/10/war-games-at-the-end-of-the-day-2010/ 
 (2) ^http://www.blogomatic3000.com/2011/10/01/top-10-gore-galore-horror-films/
 (3) ^http://www.raindance.org/site/index.php?id=545,7937,0,0,1,0
 (4) Tom Stanley can more recently be heard narrating The Hunting of the Snark

External links 
 
 
 CinemaVault

Films directed by Cosimo Alemà
2010 films
2010 horror films
Films shot in Rome
2010s thriller films
Italian independent films
2010s English-language films